Howard Clinton Reppert, Jr. (January 24, 1918 – November 5, 1989) was an American businessman and politician.

Born in Des Moines, Iowa, Reppert went to the Des Moines public schools. He served as a pilot in the United States Army Air Forces during World War II. Reppert went to University of Iowa and Drake University. He was in the transfer and storage business in Des Moines. Reppert served in the Iowa House of Representatives from 1955 to 1961 and from 1963 to 1965. He then served in the Iowa Senate from 1965 to 1969 and was a Democrat. In 1971, Reppert moved to Sarasota, Florida and was involved with the real estate business. Reppert died from cancer at his home in Sarasota, Florida.

Notes

External links

1918 births
1989 deaths
Politicians from Des Moines, Iowa
People from Sarasota, Florida
Drake University alumni
University of Iowa alumni
Businesspeople from Florida
Businesspeople from Iowa
Democratic Party members of the Iowa House of Representatives
Democratic Party Iowa state senators
United States Army Air Forces pilots
Military personnel from Iowa
Deaths from cancer in Florida
20th-century American politicians
20th-century American businesspeople